This is a list of 197 species in Phanerotoma, a genus of braconid wasps in the family Braconidae.

Phanerotoma species

 Phanerotoma acara van Achterberg, 1990 c g
 Phanerotoma acuminata Szépligeti, 1908 c g
 Phanerotoma agarwali Varshney & Shuja-Uddin, 1999 c g
 Phanerotoma alagoasensis Zettel, 1992 c g
 Phanerotoma analis Zettel, 1990 c g
 Phanerotoma andamanensis Gupta g
 Phanerotoma annulata Zettel, 1989 c g
 Phanerotoma aperta Szépligeti, 1908 c g
 Phanerotoma arakakii Zettel, 1990 c g
 Phanerotoma atra Snoflak, 1951 c g
 Phanerotoma atriceps Zettel, 1992 c g
 Phanerotoma attenuata Zettel, 1989 c g
 Phanerotoma australiensis Ashmead, 1900 c g
 Phanerotoma aviculus Saussure, 1892 c g
 Phanerotoma baltica Brues, 1933 c g
 Phanerotoma bannensis Masi, 1944 c g
 Phanerotoma behriae Zettel, 1988 c g
 Phanerotoma bekilyensis Granger, 1949 c g
 Phanerotoma bennetti Muesebeck, 1955 c g
 Phanerotoma bicolor Sonan, 1932 c g
 Phanerotoma bidentula Zettel, 1992 c g
 Phanerotoma bilinea Lyle, 1924 c g
 Phanerotoma bouceki van Achterberg, 1990 c g
 Phanerotoma brasiliensis Zettel, 1989 c g
 Phanerotoma brendelli Zettel, 1990 c g
 Phanerotoma brevis Zettel, 1990 c g
 Phanerotoma buchneri Fahringer, 1932 c g
 Phanerotoma caltagironei Zettel, 1992 c g
 Phanerotoma capeki van Achterberg, 1990 c g
 Phanerotoma caudalis Zettel, 1989 c g
 Phanerotoma caudata Granger, 1949 c g
 Phanerotoma circumscripta Zettel, 1989 c g
 Phanerotoma coccinellae Girault, 1924 c g
 Phanerotoma conopomorphae Tsang & You g
 Phanerotoma crabbi Zettel, 1990 c g
 Phanerotoma crocea (Cameron, 1887) c g
 Phanerotoma curvicarinata Cameron, 1911 c g
 Phanerotoma curvimaculata Cameron, 1911 c g
 Phanerotoma curvinervis Tobias, 2000 c g
 Phanerotoma cyrenaica Masi, 1932 c g
 Phanerotoma decorata Szepligeti, 1914 c g
 Phanerotoma decticauda Zettel, 1988 c g
 Phanerotoma dentata (Panzer, 1805) c g
 Phanerotoma divergens van Achterberg, 2009 c g
 Phanerotoma diversa (Walker, 1874) c g
 Phanerotoma ebneri Fahringer, 1924 c g
 Phanerotoma ejuncida Chen & Ji, 2003 c g
 Phanerotoma erythrocephala Rohwer, 1917 c g
 Phanerotoma exigua Zettel, 1991 c g
 Phanerotoma extensa Brues, 1933 c g
 Phanerotoma fasciata Provancher, 1881 c g
 Phanerotoma fasciatipennis Granger, 1949 c g
 Phanerotoma fastigata Zettel, 1989 c g
 Phanerotoma filicornis Zettel, 1988 c g
 Phanerotoma flava Ashmead, 1906 c g
 Phanerotoma flavida Enderlein, 1912 c g
 Phanerotoma floridana Zettel, 1992 c g
 Phanerotoma formosana Rohwer, 1934 c g
 Phanerotoma fracta Kokujev, 1903 c g
 Phanerotoma franklini Gahan, 1917 c g
 Phanerotoma fusca Zettel, 1992 c g
 Phanerotoma fuscovaria Ashmead, 1894 c g
 Phanerotoma ghesquierei de Saeger, 1948 c g
 Phanerotoma gigantea Zettel, 1990 c g
 Phanerotoma gijswijti van Achterberg, 1990 c g
 Phanerotoma glabra Telenga, 1941 c g
 Phanerotoma gracilipes (Szepligeti, 1914) c g
 Phanerotoma gracilis Tobias, 1970 c g
 Phanerotoma gracilisoma van Achterberg, 1990 c g
 Phanerotoma graciloides van Achterberg, 1990 c g
 Phanerotoma graeca Zettel, 1990 c g
 Phanerotoma grapholithae Muesebeck, 1933 c g
 Phanerotoma hapaliae de Saeger, 1948 c g
 Phanerotoma hayati Ahmad & Shuja-Uddin, 2004 c g
 Phanerotoma hendecasisella Cameron, 1905 c g
 Phanerotoma hispanica Kokujev, 1899 c g
 Phanerotoma honiarana Zettel, 1990 c g
 Phanerotoma humeralis Ashmead, 1894 c g
 Phanerotoma ichneutiptera (Vachal, 1907) c g
 Phanerotoma improvisa Zettel, 1991 c g
 Phanerotoma indica Zettel, 1990 c g
 Phanerotoma inopinata Caltagirone, 1965 c g
 Phanerotoma intermedia van Achterberg, 1990 c g
 Phanerotoma interstitialis Zettel, 1989 c g
 Phanerotoma iturica de Saeger, 1942 c g
 Phanerotoma kamtshatica Tobias, 2000 c g
 Phanerotoma kasachstanica Tobias, 1964 c g
 Phanerotoma katkowi Kokujev, 1900 c g
 Phanerotoma kobdensis Tobias, 1972 c g
 Phanerotoma kotenkoi Tobias, 2000 c g
 Phanerotoma kozlovi Shestakov, 1930 c g
 Phanerotoma laspeyresia Rohwer, 1915 c g
 Phanerotoma leeuwinensis Turner, 1917 c g
 Phanerotoma lepida Zettel, 1990 c g
 Phanerotoma leucobasis Kriechbaumer, 1894 c g
 Phanerotoma lissonota Tobias, 1972 c g
 Phanerotoma longicauda Walley, 1951 c g
 Phanerotoma longiradialis van Achterberg, 1990 c g
 Phanerotoma longiterebra Zettel, 1990 c g
 Phanerotoma maculata (Wollaston, 1858) c g
 Phanerotoma marshalli (Buysson, 1897) c g
 Phanerotoma masiana Fahringer, 1934 c g
 Phanerotoma melanocephala Fullaway, 1913 c g
 Phanerotoma melanura Zettel, 1988 c g
 Phanerotoma mellina Zettel, 1988 c g
 Phanerotoma meridionalis Ashmead, 1894 c g
 Phanerotoma minuta Kokujev, 1903 c g
 Phanerotoma mirabilis Zettel, 1990 c g
 Phanerotoma modesta Masi, 1944 c g
 Phanerotoma moniliata Ji & Chen, 2003 c g
 Phanerotoma moravica Snoflak, 1951 c g
 Phanerotoma myeloisae Fullaway, 1956 c g
 Phanerotoma nathani Zettel, 1990 c g
 Phanerotoma nepalensis Zettel, 1989 c g
 Phanerotoma nigricephala Zettel, 1990 c g
 Phanerotoma nigriceps Szepligeti, 1914 c g
 Phanerotoma nigripelta Muesebeck, 1955 c g
 Phanerotoma nigroscutis Cameron, 1905 c g
 Phanerotoma nigrotibialis Zettel, 1989 c g
 Phanerotoma nitidiventris Zettel, 1990 c g
 Phanerotoma nocturna Tobias, 1967 c g
 Phanerotoma notabilis Zettel, 1992 c g
 Phanerotoma novacaledoniensis Zettel, 1990 c g
 Phanerotoma novaehebridensis Zettel, 1990 c g
 Phanerotoma novaguineensis Szepligeti, 1900 c g
 Phanerotoma novateutoniana Zettel, 1990 c g
 Phanerotoma noyesi Zettel, 1990 c g
 Phanerotoma obscura Snoflak, 1951 c g
 Phanerotoma offensa Papp, 1989 c g
 Phanerotoma orientalis Szepligeti, 1902 c g
 Phanerotoma ornatula Brues, 1926 c g
 Phanerotoma pacifica Zettel, 1990 c g
 Phanerotoma pallida Cameron, 1911 c g
 Phanerotoma pallidipes Cameron, 1911 c g
 Phanerotoma pallidula Masi, 1945 c g
 Phanerotoma panamana Zettel, 1990 c g
 Phanerotoma pappi Zettel, 1990 c g
 Phanerotoma parastigmalis Tobias, 2000 c g
 Phanerotoma parva Kokujev, 1903 c g
 Phanerotoma pedra Papp, 1989 c g
 Phanerotoma pellucida Zettel, 1990 c g
 Phanerotoma permixtellae Fischer, 1968 c g
 Phanerotoma persa Shestakov, 1930 c g
 Phanerotoma phycitinoma de Saeger, 1942 c g
 Phanerotoma planifrons (Nees, 1816) c g
 Phanerotoma plaumanni Zettel, 1989 c g
 Phanerotoma popovi Telenga, 1941 c g
 Phanerotoma potanini Kokujev, 1895 c g
 Phanerotoma producta Watanabe, 1937 c g
 Phanerotoma puchneriana Zettel, 1992 c g
 Phanerotoma pygmaea Szepligeti, 1913 c g
 Phanerotoma pyrodercis Fischer, 1962 c g
 Phanerotoma recurvariae Cushman, 1914 c g
 Phanerotoma rhyacioniae Cushman, 1927 c g
 Phanerotoma robusta Zettel, 1988 c g
 Phanerotoma rufescens (Latreille, 1809) c g
 Phanerotoma ruficornis Granger, 1949 c g
 Phanerotoma rufotestacea Zettel, 1992 c g
 Phanerotoma samoana Fullaway, 1940 c g
 Phanerotoma sardiana Zettel, 1990 c g
 Phanerotoma saussurei Kohl, 1906 c g
 Phanerotoma sculptifrons Tobias, 1970 c g
 Phanerotoma semenowi Kokujev, 1900 c g
 Phanerotoma somaliae Masi, 1943 c g
 Phanerotoma somalica Paoli, 1934 c g
 Phanerotoma soror van Achterberg, 1990 c g
 Phanerotoma spilaspis Cameron, 1911 c g
 Phanerotoma sponsa Ji & Chen, 2002 c g
 Phanerotoma straminea Viereck, 1913 c g
 Phanerotoma subexigua Zettel, 1991 c g
 Phanerotoma subpygmaea Granger, 1949 c g
 Phanerotoma sulcus Chen & Ji, 2003 c g
 Phanerotoma syedi Ahmad & Shuja-Uddin, 2004 c g
 Phanerotoma syleptae Zettel, 1990 c g
 Phanerotoma terebralis Zettel, 1989 c g
 Phanerotoma texana Zettel, 1992 c g
 Phanerotoma tibialis (Haldeman, 1849) c g
 Phanerotoma toreutae Caltagirone, 1967 c g
 Phanerotoma transcaspica Kokujev, 1902 c g
 Phanerotoma tricolorata Zettel, 1988 c g
 Phanerotoma tridentati Ji & Chen, 2003 c g
 Phanerotoma tritoma (Marshall, 1898) c g
 Phanerotoma trivittata Brues, 1912 c g
 Phanerotoma trivittatoides Zettel, 1989 c g
 Phanerotoma tropicana Zettel, 1989 c g
 Phanerotoma uniformis Brues, 1926 c g
 Phanerotoma unipunctata Cushman, 1922 c g
 Phanerotoma upoluensis Zettel, 1990 c g
 Phanerotoma valentina Moreno & Jimenez, 1992 c g
 Phanerotoma vana de Saeger, 1948 c g
 Phanerotoma variegata Szepligeti, 1914 c g
 Phanerotoma vidua De Santis, 1975 c g
 Phanerotoma wahlbergianae Fischer, 1963 c g
 Phanerotoma waitzbaueri Zettel, 1987 c g
 Phanerotoma zebripes Chen & Ji, 2003 c g
 Phanerotoma zelleriae Zettel, 1992 c g
 Phanerotoma zinovjevi Tobias, 2000 c g

This is a list of 197 species in Phanerotoma, a genus of braconid wasps in the family Braconidae.
Data sources: i = ITIS, c = Catalogue of Life, g = GBIF, b = Bugguide.net

References

Phanerotoma